Kamareddy is a town and headquarters of eponymous district in Telangana state in India.

Geography 
It covers an area of 14.11 km2. It is 110 km northwards from the state capital Hyderabad and 55 km south from the erstwhile district headquarters of Nizamabad. After formation of Telangana state in 2014, Kamareddy became district headquarters.

Demographics 
According to 2011 census and the statistical information by the Government of Telangana, the population of the town stood at 80,378. Kamareddy had a population of 64,496. Males constitute 51% of the population and females 49%. Kamareddy has an average literacy rate of higher than 65%, male literacy is greater than 74%, and female literacy is more than 56%. In Kamareddy, 13% of the population is under 6 years of age.

Language 
Major language spoken in the town is Telugu,hindi.

Government and politics 
Kamareddy Municipality was constituted in 1987 and is classified as a second grade municipality with 33 election wards.
After Telangana's General elections surrounding villages merged in Kamareddy municipality. Adloor, Tekriyal, Lingapoor, Devunipally, Sarampally and Chinnamallareddy added to Kamareddy municipality.

Kamareddy comes under the Zahirabad parliamentary constituency. The town shelters 17 notified slums with a population of 35,197 and 4,853 BPL households.

Economy 
Kamareddy's Main source of income is Agriculture most of the families depended on agriculture. Kamareddy produces paddy, sugar, jaggery, different vegetables, maize and turmeric. There are around 318 textile business centers. Telangana biggest poultry farms are in Kamareddy rural and urban areas. One of the major agriculture market yard is located in Kamareddy. Kamareddy is the major center for the surrounding towns and villages. Kamareddy is a major market in state of Telangana.
Kamareddy has agriculture based industries like Gayathri Sugars and Several rice mills which produces large scale of food products like Sugar, Rice and many more products.
Kamareddy has rapid growth in real estate new buildings, shopping malls and residential apartments are in under construction. it is also prime location for all medical speciality and Superspeciality hospitals which give service to surrounding districts also.  well known doctors like late Dr Anjalreddy, late Dr Bhairaiah, late Dr Eswardas, Dr Dattaiah established hospitals since 50 years.

Transport 
Kamareddy has two bus stands, and a railway station with connectivity to most major cities in Telangana, Andhra Pradesh and Maharashtra. Kamareddy connects with major highways like NH44 (old NH7) which is the longest highway in India. Kamareddy has major road line it connects to all major cities in India.
Kamareddy has major railway line secunderabad-Manmad railway line. Kamareddy railway connects to major cities in India.

References

External links 

Cities and towns in Kamareddy district